Ricardo Fyeet (born 24 September 1976) is a retired Dutch professional kickboxer and mixed martial artist. A professional in MMA from 1998 until 2001, he competed for RINGS and It's Showtime.

Personal life
Fyeet's brother, Andre, is also a former kickboxer and mixed martial artist who competed primarily in the Light Heavyweight division and trained out of Mike's Gym. Andre retired in 2010 with a record of 5-12.

Fyeet currently lives in Amsterdam, running his own school; Team Fyeet.

Mixed martial arts record

|-
| Win
| align=center| 5–6 (1)
| Sander MacKilljan
| DQ
| It's Showtime: Original
| 
| align=center| 1
| align=center| 0:56
| Haarlem, Holland
| 
|-
| Loss
| align=center| 4–6 (1)
| Hirotaka Yokoi
| Submission (armbar)
| RINGS: 10th Anniversary
| 
| align=center| 1
| align=center| 2:34
| Tokyo, Japan
| 
|-
| Loss
| align=center| 4–5 (1)
| Masayuki Naruse
| Submission (toe hold)
| RINGS: Battle Genesis Vol. 7
| 
| align=center| 1
| align=center| 3:46
| Tokyo, Japan
| 
|-
| Loss
| align=center| 4–4 (1)
| Rodney Glunder
| Submission (guillotine choke)
| RINGS Holland: Heroes Live Forever
| 
| align=center| 2
| align=center| 1:04
| Utrecht, Holland
| 
|-
| Loss
| align=center| 4–3 (1)
| Andrei Kopylov
| Submission (achilles lock)
| RINGS: King of Kings 1999 Block B
| 
| align=center| 1
| align=center| 0:08
| Osaka, Japan
| 
|-
| Win
| align=center| 4–2 (1)
| Tyrone Roberts
| KO (head kick)
| RINGS: King of Kings 1999 Block B
| 
| align=center| 2
| align=center| 0:09
| Osaka, Japan
| 
|-
| Loss
| align=center| 3–2 (1)
| Alistair Overeem
| Submission (guillotine choke)
| It's Showtime (kickboxing)
| 
| align=center| 1
| align=center| 1:39
| Haarlem, Holland
| 
|-
| Win
| align=center| 3–1 (1)
| Mick Cutajar
| KO (elbows)
| RINGS: Battle Genesis Vol. 5
| 
| align=center| 1
| align=center| 3:30
| Tokyo, Japan
| 
|-
| Loss
| align=center| 2–1 (1)
| Lee Hasdell
| Submission (toe hold)
| RINGS: Rise 5th
| 
| align=center| 1
| align=center| 15:01
| Yokohama, Japan
| 
|-
| NC
| align=center| 2–0 (1)
| Jerrel Venetiaan
| No Contest
| RINGS Holland: The Kings of the Magic Ring
| 
| align=center| 1
| align=center| 1:08
| Utrecht, Holland
|Heavyweight debut.
|-
| Win
| align=center| 2–0
| Tjerk Vermanen
| TKO (elbow injury)
| RINGS Holland: Judgement Day
| 
| align=center| 1
| align=center| 1:10
| Amsterdam, Holland
| 
|-
| Win
| align=center| 1–0
| Andrew Keja
| KO (punches)
| RINGS Holland: The Thialf Explosion
| 
| align=center| 1
| align=center| 0:45
| Heerenveen, Holland
|

References

External links
 

1976 births
Living people
Dutch male mixed martial artists
Mixed martial artists utilizing kickboxing
Dutch male kickboxers
Sportspeople from Haarlem
Place of birth missing (living people)